Loxerebia is a butterfly genus of the subfamily Satyrinae. The genus is confined to China (including Tibet), Mongolia, Burma, Thailand and Laos. Most species are endemic to China.

Species
 Loxerebia albipuncta (Leech, 1890)
 Loxerebia bocki (Oberthür, 1893)
 Loxerebia carola (Oberthür, 1893)
 Loxerebia delavayi (Oberthür, 1891)
 Loxerebia innupta (South, 1913)
 Loxerebia loczyi (Frivaldsky, 1885)
 Loxerebia martyr Watkins, 1927
 Loxerebia megalops (Alphéraky, 1895)
 Loxerebia narasingha (Moore, 1857)
 Loxerebia phyllis (Leech, 1891)
 Loxerebia pieli Huang & Wu, 2003
 Loxerebia pratorum (Oberthür, 1886)
 Loxerebia ruricola (Leech, 1890)
 Loxerebia rurigena (Leech, 1890)
 Loxerebia saxicola (Oberthür, 1876)
 Loxerebia seitzi (Goltz, 1939)
 Loxerebia sylvicola (Oberthür, 1886)
 Loxerebia yphthimoides (Oberthür, 1891)
 Loxerebia yukikoae Sugiyama, 1992

References
"Loxerebia Watkins, 1925" at Markku Savela's Lepidoptera and Some Other Life Forms

External links
Images representing Loxerebia at Consortium for the Barcode of Life

Satyrini
Butterfly genera
Taxa named by Charles James Watkins